The Lakeland Downs mouse (Leggadina lakedownensis) is a species of rodent in the family Muridae.
It is found only in Australia.
Its natural habitat is dry savanna.

References

Leggadina
Mammals of Western Australia
Mammals of the Northern Territory
Mammals of Queensland
Rodents of Australia
Mammals described in 1976
Taxonomy articles created by Polbot